Jakub Kafka (born 16 October 1976) is a Czech former football player.

Kafka played for several Gambrinus liga clubs, including Baník Ostrava, Marila Příbram and Dynamo České Budějovice. In 2007, he moved to Poland to play for GKS Jastrzębie. After two years, he moved back to the Czech Republic to play for MFK Karviná.

Kafka also played for youth Czech national football teams since the under-17 level.

External links
 
 
 

1976 births
Living people
Czech footballers
Czech Republic youth international footballers
Czech Republic under-21 international footballers
Czech First League players
FC Baník Ostrava players
FK Fotbal Třinec players
MFK Vítkovice players
1. FK Příbram players
SK Dynamo České Budějovice players
MFK Karviná players
Expatriate footballers in Poland
Association football goalkeepers
GKS Jastrzębie players
Sportspeople from Karviná